Leslyn Mililani "Alakaʻi" Paleka is an actress, singer, recording artist, emcee, and prominent radio personality on the Hawaiian island of Maui. She is best known for her morning radio show on KPOA 93.5 where she earned the nickname, "The Morning Goddess."

Radio

KPOA 93.5FM
Alakaʻi Paleka is best known for her radio personality on the Maui Hawaiian music radio station KPOA 93.5FM. She was the first show of the day on the radio station and was therefore given the Hawaiian name, "Alakaʻi", which means leader or to lead. Her jovial personality captured the island of Maui and soon she was given the nickname, "The Morning Goddess."

Other work
Paleka was cast in the comedy film Ho'olawe: Give and Take, which completed about two-thirds of its shooting days before production was canceled in 2000 due to financing issues.

Paleka was a staple at the Maui County Fair where she emceed the fair's entertainment. She announced and coordinated the Maui County Healthy Baby Contest.

Awards
Maui Time newspaper named Paleka the best local radio DJ each year from 2006 to 2011.

Personal life
Paleka's father, Daniel, was a Marine veteran of the Korean War who died in June 2006 at age 72. He was an entertainer and member of the Hawaii Association of Recording Artists.

References

External links

Living people
Native Hawaiian musicians
Native Hawaiian people
People from Maui
Singers from Hawaii
American radio personalities
Year of birth missing (living people)